Pursuant to Article 47 of the Law on Internal Regulations of the Islamic Consultative Assembly (Parliament of the Islamic Republic of Iran), the Social Commission of the Islamic Consultative Assembly is formed to perform the assigned duties in the scope of administrative and employment affairs, labor, occupation, labor relations and cooperation in accordance with the provisions of the regulation.

Some of the responsibilities of this commission are:

 Review plans and laws related to government financial regulations with the cooperation of the relevant officials and agencies
 Review plans and laws related to Social Welfare System of the Islamic Republic of Iran with the cooperation of the relevant officials and agencies
 Review the programs and measures taken to reduce social harms
 Investigate workers' issues and problems
 Review of the plan to organize the employment of government employees with the cooperation of the relevant officials and agencies
 Reviewing plans related to working standards, insurance issues, services, workers' salaries and supporting workshops and industries in the field of labor and employment
 Review plans and laws related to insurance and retirement records, pension funds and job security with the cooperation of the relevant officials and agencies
 Review plans and laws related to development of employment in the country with the cooperation of the relevant officials and agencies

Members 
The members of the Social Commission of the Islamic Consultative Assembly in the second year of the 11th term of the Assembly are as follows:

See also 
 Program, Budget and Accounting Commission of the Islamic Consultative Assembly
 Education, Research and Technology Commission of the Islamic Consultative Assembly
 Health and Medical Commission of the Islamic Consultative Assembly
 Integration Commission of the Islamic Consultative Assembly
 Joint Commission of the Islamic Consultative Assembly
 Special Commission of the Islamic Consultative Assembly
 The history of the parliament in Iran

References

Committees of the Iranian Parliament
Islamic Consultative Assembly